Switzerland participated at the Eurovision Song Contest 2007 with the song "Vampires Are Alive" written by René Baumann and Axel Breitung. The song was performed by DJ BoBo, which is the artistic name of singer René Baumann who was internally selected by the Swiss broadcaster SRG SSR idée suisse in December 2006 to represent the nation at the 2007 contest in Helsinki, Finland. "Vampires Are Alive" was presented to the public as the Swiss song on 21 February 2007.

Switzerland competed in the semi-final of the Eurovision Song Contest which took place on 10 May 2007. Performing during the show in position 8, "Vampires Are Alive" was not announced among the top 10 entries of the semi-final and therefore did not qualify to compete in the final. It was later revealed that Switzerland placed twentieth out of the 28 participating countries in the semi-final with 40 points.

Background

Prior to the 2007 contest, Switzerland had participated in the Eurovision Song Contest forty-seven times since its first entry in 1956. Switzerland is noted for having won the first edition of the Eurovision Song Contest with the song "Refrain" performed by Lys Assia. Their second and, to this point, most recent victory was achieved in 1988 when Canadian singer Céline Dion won the contest with the song "Ne partez pas sans moi". In 2005, the internal selection of Estonian girl band Vanilla Ninja, performing the song "Cool Vibes", qualified Switzerland to the final where they placed 8th. Due to their successful result in 2005, Switzerland was pre-qualified to compete directly in the final in 2006 when six4one and their song "If We All Give a Little" placed 16th.

The Swiss national broadcaster, SRG SSR idée suisse, broadcasts the event within Switzerland and organises the selection process for the nation's entry. SRG SSR idée suisse confirmed their intentions to participate at the 2007 Eurovision Song Contest on 11 July 2006. Along with their participation confirmation, the broadcaster also announced that the Swiss entry for the 2007 contest would be selected internally. Switzerland has selected their entry for the Eurovision Song Contest through both national finals and internal selections in the past. Since 2005, the Swiss entry was internally selected for the competition.

Before Eurovision

Internal selection 

On 11 July 2006, SRG SSR idée suisse opened a submission period for interested artists and composers to submit their entries until 30 November 2006. Eligible artists were those that have had television and stage experience (live performances), have made at least one video and have released at least one CD which placed among the top 50 in an official chart. In addition to the public submission, the broadcaster was also in contact with individual composers and lyricists as well as the music industry to be involved in the selection process.

On 14 December 2006, SRG SSR idée suisse announced that DJ BoBo had been selected to represent Switzerland in Helsinki. "Vampires Are Alive" was presented to the public as the song on 21 February 2007 via the release of the official music video. Both the artist and song were selected from over 60 entry submissions by a jury panel consisting of representatives of the three broadcasters in Switzerland: the Swiss-German broadcaster Schweizer Fernsehen (SF), the Swiss-French broadcaster Télévision Suisse Romande (TSR) and the Swiss-Italian broadcaster Televisione svizzera di lingua italiana (TSI), as well as the music channel VIVA Switzerland. "Vampires Are Alive" was written by René Baumann (DJ BoBo) together with Axel Breitung, and features uncredited vocals by Kimia Scarlett.

Controversy 
"Vampires Are Alive" was met with concern from Christian parties in Switzerland due to the song lyrics which may encourage satanism and suicidal tendencies. SRG SSR idée suisse later issued a statement assuring that they will not be recommending DJ BoBo to change the song as young people will not misunderstand the lyrics.

Promotion 
DJ BoBo specifically promoted "Vampires Are Alive" as the Swiss Eurovision entry on 28 February 2007 by performing the song during the Greek Eurovision national final Eurovision 2007. In addition to the international appearance, DJ BoBo also performed the song during the SF1 show Benissimo on 10 March.

At Eurovision

According to Eurovision rules, all nations with the exceptions of the host country, the "Big Four" (France, Germany, Spain and the United Kingdom) and the ten highest placed finishers in the 2006 contest are required to qualify from the semi-final on 10 May 2007 in order to compete for the final on 12 May 2007. On 12 March 2007, a special allocation draw was held which determined the running order for the semi-final and Switzerland was set to perform in position 8, following the entry from Montenegro and before the entry from Moldova.

In Switzerland, three broadcasters that form SRG SSR idée suisse aired the contest. Bernard Thurnheer provided German commentary both shows airing on SF zwei. Jean-Marc Richard provided French commentary on TSR 2 together with Nicolas Tanner for the semi-final and Henri Dès for the final. Sandy Altermatt and Claudio Lazzarino provided Italian commentary for the semi-final on TSI 2 and the final on TSI 1. The Swiss spokesperson, who announced the Swiss votes during the final, was Sven Epiney.

Semi-final 
DJ BoBo took part in technical rehearsals on 4 and 6 May, followed by dress rehearsals on 9 and 10 May. The Swiss performance featured DJ BoBo performing on stage in a black leather outfit together with vocalist Kimia Scarlett and four dancers. The stage featured several human models and LED screens displayed flying bats and lightning. The performance also featured several effects including smoke and fireworks. The dancers that joined DJ BoBo were: Anthony Moriah, Kurt Burger, Nicole Ganzhorn and Renick Bernadina.

At the end of the show, Switzerland was not announced among the top 10 entries in the semi-final and therefore failed to qualify to compete in the final. It was later revealed that Switzerland placed twentieth in the semi-final, receiving a total of 40 points.

Voting 
Below is a breakdown of points awarded to Switzerland and awarded by Switzerland in the semi-final and grand final of the contest. The nation awarded its 12 points to Serbia in the semi-final and the final of the contest.

Points awarded to Switzerland

Points awarded by Switzerland

References

2007
Countries in the Eurovision Song Contest 2007
Eurovision